Arika Kane is the eponymous debut studio album by American singer-songwriter Arika Kane. It was released by BSE Recordings on February 23, 2010.

Track listing

Credits and personnel
Credits below are adapted from Allmusic.

Lou Humphrey — Executive producer, producer, arranger, layout designer
Alan Jones — Executive producer
Arika Kane — Layout designer, photoshop artist, producer, arranger
Andrew Austin — Stylist
Michael Benabib — Photography
Karen Bishop — Hair stylist
John Francis, Jr. — Engineer, mixing engineer
Jorge Guzmán — Logo designer
Brandon Hodge — Producer
Rowena Husbands — Photography
Chris Bickley — Lead Guitar on Track 10
Andy Krehm — Mastering
Lanier Long — Make-up
Michael Lyndin — Photoshop artist
Carey Mellers — Producer
Edwin Ramos — Mixing engineer
Nicole Shallows — Make-up
Lilian Smith — Executive producer, layout designer
Michael Terry — Engineer
Steve Thompson — Engineer
Richard A. Vona — Executive producer
Ronnie Wright — Photography

Release history

References

External links
arikakane.com  — Official Website

2010 debut albums
Arika Kane albums